Aglaia smithii is a species of plant in the family Meliaceae. It is found in Indonesia and the Philippines.

References

smithii
Vulnerable plants
Taxonomy articles created by Polbot
Taxa named by Sijfert Hendrik Koorders